Ivankovac is a village in the municipality of Ćuprija, Serbia. According to the 2002 census, the village has a population of 267. It was the site of the Battle of Ivankovac.

Climate

References

Populated places in Pomoravlje District